On The Contrary is an oil on canvas painting by Kay Sage, painted in 1952. It is housed in the Walker Art Center in Minneapolis, Minnesota.

References 
 artsconnected writeup

1952 paintings
Surrealist paintings